The Patience of Maigret is a 1939 detective novel by the Belgian writer Georges Simenon featuring his character Jules Maigret.

Synopsis
Maigret searches for evidence that an old nemesis of his is behind a series of jewel robberies. Maigret believes the ageing gangster is organising a gang from his apartment. However, when the gangster is found dead, Maigret investigates his criminal connections and his neighbours trying to find the murderer.

Adaptations
It has been adapted several times for television. In 1992 it was made into an episode of an ITV Maigret series starring Michael Gambon.

References

1939 Belgian novels
Maigret novels
Presses de la Cité books